is a former Japanese football player.

Playing career
Fujita was born in Osaka Prefecture on April 10, 1973. After graduating from Kindai University, he joined Japan Football League (JFL) club Kawasaki Frontale in 1996. In 1998, he moved to JFL club Albirex Niigata. The club was promoted to new league J2 League from 1999. In 2000, he moved to J2 club Ventforet Kofu. He played many matches and retired at the end of the 2000 season.

Club statistics

References

External links

1973 births
Living people
Kindai University alumni
Association football people from Osaka Prefecture
Japanese footballers
J2 League players
Japan Football League (1992–1998) players
Kawasaki Frontale players
Albirex Niigata players
Ventforet Kofu players
Association football defenders